Stefan Sjöstrand (born 8 April 1962) is a Swedish boxer. He competed in the men's light welterweight event at the 1984 Summer Olympics.

References

1962 births
Living people
Swedish male boxers
Olympic boxers of Sweden
Boxers at the 1984 Summer Olympics
Sportspeople from Stockholm
Light-welterweight boxers
20th-century Swedish people